The Scientists of Modern Music were an electronic group from Hobart, Australia, consisting of Cal Young and Simon McIntosh.

History

In 2004, Cal Young & Simon McIntosh started wagging audio design classes together, in order to jam on a very old drum kit and an un-tunable guitar just for kicks. They later progressed into electronic music, hoarding bits and pieces off eBay to start a band which became The Scientists of Modern Music. The duo came second in a college band competition, strangely listed under 'acoustic rock', but still managed to make an impact which scored them a couple of local shows in late 2005. From there Cal and Simon wrote a handful of songs in the space of two weeks and released a home brew EP, which gained them a special mention on Triple J and secured TSOMM a place on various radio stations around Australia. After performing around the mainland a multiple times, the duo were spotted by the head of Rubber Records (Melbourne) and signed to the label to release their debut commercial EP 'Electronic Sunset'.

The band then embarked on various shows, and played the festival circuit including both Falls Festivals and Golden Plains Festival, toured with bands such as Midnight Juggernauts, The Presets and the Dukes of Windsor. They then re-released their EP as an album length CD which scored them rotation on Triple J for their song 'Easy'.

TSOMM's debut album A Personal Universe was released via Rubber/Shock on Friday 18 May 2012. It was produced between September 2008 and December 2010. The duo went to London to complete the record with Rob Haggett and David Treahearn of The Slips, and it was mastered by the late Nilesh Patel and Simon Davey at The Exchange.

Live
The band is known for its energetic and exciting live shows.
Young and McIntosh have even been known to get off stage and join the crowd to mosh, while the music keeps playing.
When performing live, the band have a distinctive dress: Cal Young wears a black suit, black shirt and black shoes and Simon McIntosh wears all white in a similar fashion.

Band members
Cal Young - Synthesiser, Vocoder, Vocals
Simon McIntosh - Synthesiser, Vocoder, Vocals, Guitar

Discography
 Number One (EP) (2006)
 Robot On (single) (2006)
 Electronic Sunset (EP) (2007)
 Electronic Sunset (Album length) (2008)
 Because If I Die (Single) (2011)
 Girl On Top (Single) (2011)
 A Personal Universe (Debut album) (18 May 2012)

Performances

Festivals
Falls Festival (2006)
MS Fest (2007)
Southern Roots Festival (2007)
Falls Festival (2007)
Soundscape Festival (2008)
Golden Plains Festival (2008)
Climate Festivals (2008)
Grazzhopper Festival (2008)
Pyramid Rock Festival (2008)
Meredith Music Festival (2008)
Kiss My Grass (2009)
MS Fest (2009)
Hot Barbeque (2010)
Sandcastles (2010)
MONA FOMA (2011)
Falls Festival (2011/12)
Breath Of Life Festival (2012)

Supports
The Presets
Infusion
Gerling
Midnight Juggernauts
Van She
Crazy Penis
Girl Talk
Regurgitator
Dukes of Windsor
The Galvatrons
JD Samson & MEN
The Adults

References

External links
Official Myspace
Triple J Page

2005 establishments in Australia
2012 disestablishments in Australia
Musical groups established in 2005
Musical groups disestablished in 2012
Tasmanian musical groups
Australian electronic musicians
Culture in Hobart